University of Eldoret is one of the 22 public universities in Kenya and situated approximately 9 km along the Eldoret-Ziwa road in Eldoret town, Uasin Gishu County. It was founded in 1946 by the white settlers as a Large Scale Farmers Training Centre. In 1984, it was converted to a teachers’ training college and renamed Moi Teachers’ Training College to offer Diploma Science Teachers Training. 
Due to the double intake crisis, the college was taken over by Moi University as a campus in 1990, renaming it Chepkoilel Campus. From 1990, the university made it a campus of Natural, Basic and Applied Science programmes.

In August 2010, President Mwai Kibaki, through Legal Notice No. 125 of 13 August 2010 upgraded the campus into a University College with the name Chepkoilel University College, a Constituent College of Moi University. 
Upon the award of charter by the president  in March 2013, the University College was renamed University of Eldoret.

Schools/Faculties and Departments
The university has the following schools;
 Agriculture and Biotechnology
 Business and Management Sciences
 Education
 Engineering
 Environmental Studies
 Environmental Studies – Arts
 Environmental Studies – Science
 Human Resource Development
 Natural Resource Management
 Science
 Economics

The University on Friday 7 February 2013 added its first campus in Eldoret town-Town campus-Housing School of
Environmental studies
Human Resource
Business and management sciences
Education (Arts)

Graduation
Held its First Graduation Ceremony on 3 December 2013 at the University Sports Pavilion
Held its Second Graduation Ceremony on 28 November 2014 at the University Sports Pavilion
Held its Third Graduation Ceremony on 27 November 2015 at the University Sports Pavilion
Held its Fourth Graduation Ceremony on 25 November 2016 at the University Sports Pavilion
Held its Fifth Graduation Ceremony on 24 November 2017 at the University Sports Pavilion

References

External links

Universities and colleges in Kenya
Educational institutions established in 2013
2013 establishments in Kenya
Uasin Gishu County
Universities in Kenya
1946 establishments in Kenya
Education in Rift Valley Province